Srđan Čolaković is a Yugoslavian former professional footballer who played as a forward.

References

1965 births
Living people
Serbian footballers
Yugoslav footballers
Association football forwards
TSV 1860 Munich players
Edessaikos F.C. players
Hapoel Beit She'an F.C. players
Hapoel Haifa F.C. players
Super League Greece players
Liga Leumit players
Serbian expatriate footballers
Expatriate footballers in Germany
Expatriate footballers in Greece
Expatriate footballers in Israel
Serbian expatriate sportspeople in Germany
Serbian expatriate sportspeople in Greece
Serbian expatriate sportspeople in Israel